Alfonso Escámez, 1st Marquess of Águilas (1 January 1916 – 16 May 2010) was a Spanish banker. He was the president of Banco Central from 1973 until 1992. He was awarded the title "Marquess of Águilas" by King Juan Carlos I.

Escámez died on 16 May 2010, at the age of 94.

References 

1916 births
2010 deaths
Spanish bankers